Gossen Idrettslag is a Norwegian sports club from Aukra. It has sections for association football, handball and volleyball.

The club was founded as a merger of Sør-Gossen FK and Nord-Gossen IL in 1967.

The men's football team plays in the 6. Divisjon, the seventh tier of Norwegian football. The team had a long streak in the 3. Divisjon, last from 1998 through 2006. Their best-known players are the Rindarøy  and Breivik brothers, Knut Olav and Ole Martin, Emil Breivik and Mathias Varhaugvik Breivik.

References

 Official site 

Football clubs in Norway
Sport in Møre og Romsdal
Aukra
Association football clubs established in 1967
Handball clubs established in 1967
Volleyball clubs established in 1967
1967 establishments in Norway